Qaouzah is a Lebanese village located in the Caza of Bint Jbeil in the Nabatiye Governorate in Lebanon.

Geography

Qaouzah occupies a hill with elevation ranging from 700 to 800 meters above sea level.  The main agricultural products of Qaouzah are olive, carob and tobacco.

Demography
The people of Qaouzah are Lebanese and are almost exclusive Maronite Christians.

History
In 1881, the PEF's Survey of Western Palestine (SWP)  described it: "A small village, containing about 100 Christians, with a small Christian chapel situated on a hill-top, with figs, olives, and arable land; a few cisterns for the water supply.”

Modern era
In July 2006, Qaouzah, like other villages that string Lebanon's southern border, such as Ain Ebel, Debel, Rmaich, and Yaroun, was caught in the  2006 Lebanon War of Hezbollah and the Israeli army.

References

Bibliography

External links
Survey of Western Palestine, Map 4: IAA, Wikimedia commons 
Qaouzah, Localiban

Populated places in Bint Jbeil District
Maronite Christian communities in Lebanon